Silvia Todeschini (born December 2, 1967) is a former Italian female basketball player.

External links
Profile at sports-reference.com

1967 births
Living people
Basketball players at the 1992 Summer Olympics
Italian women's basketball players
Olympic basketball players of Italy
Point guards
Basketball players from Milan